The Xinjiang Wars were a series of armed conflicts which took place within Xinjiang in the Republic of China during the Warlord Era and Chinese Civil War. The wars also played an important role in the East Turkestan independence movement.

Major conflicts
 Kumul Rebellion (1931–1934)
 Soviet invasion of Xinjiang (1934)
 Charkhlik revolt (1935)
 Islamic rebellion in Xinjiang (1937)
 Ili Rebellion (1944–1949)

Battles
Battle of Aksu (1933)
Battle of Sekes Tash
Battle of Kashgar (1933)
Battle of Toksun

Incidents
Kirghiz rebellion

See also
Qinghai–Tibet War
Sino-Tibetan War

 
20th century in Xinjiang
Wars involving the Republic of China
1930s conflicts
1930s in China
Islam in China
Military history of the Republic of China (1912–1949)